The 2014–15 La Liga season (known as the Liga BBVA for sponsorship reasons) was the 84th season of the premier association football league in Spain. The campaign began on 23 August 2014 and ended on 24 May 2015.

Barcelona won its 23rd title on 17 May 2015 after defeating defending champions Atlético Madrid at the Vicente Calderón Stadium, and also equalled the all-time record goal difference of +89 (110 goals scored and 21 conceded), originally set by Real Madrid in the 2011–12 season. Barcelona won the title with 94 points, two more than Real Madrid.

Teams

Promotion and relegation (pre-season)
A total of 20 teams contest the league, including 17 sides from the 2013–14 season and three promoted from the 2013–14 Segunda División. This includes the two top teams (Eibar and Deportivo La Coruña) from the Segunda División, and the winner of the play-offs, Córdoba.

Eibar became the first club from Segunda División to achieve promotion to La Liga after its 1–0 victory over Alavés on 25 May 2014. Eibar made their La Liga debut in the 2014–15 season.

Deportivo La Coruña won promotion back to La Liga after one season in Segunda División with a 1–0 victory over Real Jaén on 31 May 2014.

Córdoba won the promotion play-off against Las Palmas and returned to the top level after 42 years.

Stadia and locations

Personnel and sponsorship

1. On the back of shirt.
2. On the sleeves.
3. On the shorts.
4. Barcelona makes a donation to UNICEF to display the charity's logo on the club's kit.
5. Málaga makes a donation to UNESCO in order to display the charity's logo on the club's kit.
6. Additionally, referee kits are now being made by Adidas, sponsored by Würth, and Nike has a new match ball, the Ordem LFP

Managerial changes

Overview
On 2 May, Córdoba were relegated with three games left to play in the season, after losing 0–8 at home against Barcelona. Eight days later, Villarreal confirmed sixth place and an entry into the UEFA Europa League with Joel Campbell's winning goal against Elche.

Barcelona, playing with a three-man attack of Lionel Messi, Neymar and Luis Suárez under new manager Luis Enrique, won the title on 17 May with a goal by Messi to defeat holders Atlético Madrid at the Vicente Calderón Stadium. It came exactly a year after Atlético had won their league title at Barcelona's Camp Nou. Real Madrid secured second place on the same day as Barcelona won the title, with a 1–4 win at Espanyol. In the end, Barcelona amassed 94 points, while Real Madrid finished just two points behind, with 92.

The battle for the Champions League was settled in the last ten minutes of the season. Valencia, in fourth place with 74 points, went into the last match of the season at relegation-threatened Almería, facing all three possibilities of direct qualification to the group stage of the Champions League, qualification to the play-off round, or missing out on the Champions League altogether. Valencia won the match 3–2 to secure fourth place, as Atlético Madrid, three points ahead, drew at Granada. Sevilla, with a 3–2 win at Málaga, achieved a record 76 points total without Champions League qualification, finishing fifth. Sevilla however qualified for the Champions League by winning the 2015 UEFA Europa League Final. 

Earlier in the season, on 7 February, Atlético Madrid achieved a 4–0 victory over city rivals Real Madrid. It was Real's biggest loss since a 5–0 loss to Barcelona in November 2010. 

Despite finishing the season in the 13th position, on 5 June, Elche was relegated to Segunda División due to its financial struggles. Newcomers Eibar, who finished the season in the 18th position, took Elche's place in 2015–16 La Liga.

League table

Results

Season statistics

Scoring
First goal of the season:   Luis Alberto for Málaga against Athletic Bilbao (23 August 2014)
Last goal of the season:   Marcelo for Real Madrid against Getafe (23 May 2015)

Top goalscorers
The Pichichi Trophy is awarded by newspaper Marca to the player who scores the most goals in a season.

Zamora Trophy
The Zamora Trophy is awarded by newspaper Marca to the goalkeeper with least goals-to-games ratio. Keepers must play at least 28 games of 60 or more minutes to be eligible for the trophy.

Hat-tricks

4 Player scored four goals5 Player scored five goals(H) – Home ; (A) – Away

Discipline

 Most yellow cards (club): 115
 Almería
 Most yellow cards (player): 15
 Víctor Sánchez (Espanyol)
 Most red cards (club): 9
 Almería
 Most red cards (player): 2
 Marcos Angeleri (Málaga)
 Sebastián Dubarbier (Almería)
 Michel (Almería)
 Raúl Navas (Eibar)
 Federico Piovaccari (Eibar)

Attendances

LaLiga Awards

Seasonal
La Liga's governing body, the Liga Nacional de Fútbol Profesional, honoured the competition's best players and coach with the La Liga Awards.

Team of the Year

Monthly

Number of teams by autonomous community

References

External links

 
2014-15

1
Spain